The 1957 Los Angeles State Diablos football team represented Los Angeles State College—now known as California State University, Los Angeles—as a member of the California Collegiate Athletic Association (CCAA) during the 1957 NCAA College Division football season. Led by seventh-year head coach Leonard Adams, Los Angeles State compiled an overall record of 5–4 with a mark of 1–1 in conference play, tying for third place in the CCAA. The Diablos played four home games at four separate sites: Snyder Stadium in Los Angeles, East Los Angeles College Stadium in Monterey Park, California, Reseda High School in Reseda, Los Angeles, and the Rose Bowl in Pasadena, California.

Schedule

Team players in the NFL
The following Los Angeles State players were selected in the 1958 NFL Draft.

References

Los Angeles State
Cal State Los Angeles Diablos football seasons
Los Angeles State Diablos football